Longterm Mentality is the debut studio album by American hip hop recording artist Ab-Soul. It was released on April 5, 2011, by Top Dawg Entertainment (TDE), exclusively to digital retailers, serving as Ab-Soul's debut retail release. The album features guest appearances from Jhené Aiko, Schoolboy Q, Kendrick Lamar, Punch, Alori Joh, JaVonté, MURS, BJ the Chicago Kid and Pat Brown, with the production from American hip hop record producers such as Tae Beast, Ayiro, Sounwave, AAyhasis, Context, Alexis Carrington and Tommy Black. Upon its release, the album was highly acclaimed by music critics.

Background 
Preceded by the mixtapes such as Longterm: The Mixtape (2009) and Longterm 2: Lifestyles of the Broke and Almost Famous (2010), Ab-Soul stated Longterm Mentality is not the third installment in his Longterm series. In July 2010, in an interview with Complex, Stevens claimed the series would have four installments, "When I did the first Longterm I knew that there would be four of them. When I did the first one. So there will be four of them: Longterm 1, 2, 3, and 4. So right now we're at two. You'll have to wait for the next one. That's for the next Ab-Soul interview." In August 2011, in an interview with BlowHipHopTV, Ab-Soul explained in spite of the fact that Longterm Mentality is not a part of the series, all three projects paint a picture of his personal life and growth. While speaking with BlowHipHopTV, the Black Hippy member said that the project is intended to introduce listeners to the man behind the mic:

Track listing 

Sample credits
 "Moscato" contains a sample of "Time", as performed by Morning, Noon & Night.
 "#LTM" contains a sample of "Breathe (Jazz version)", as performed by Télépopmusik.

Charts

References 

2011 debut albums
Top Dawg Entertainment albums
Ab-Soul albums
Albums produced by Sounwave
Albums produced by Tae Beast